Eriaporinae is a subfamily of chalcid wasps in the order Hymenoptera, family Pirenidae. There are 2 genera and 6 described species in Eriaporinae.

Eriaporinae was formerly considered a subfamily of the family Aphelinidae.

Genera
 Eunotiscus Compere, 1928
 Promuscidea Girault, 1917

References

Further reading

 
 
 

Parasitic wasps
Chalcidoidea

Insects described in 1955
Hymenoptera subfamilies